Justin Papineau (born January 15, 1980), is a Canadian former professional ice hockey centre who last played for Adler Mannheim of the Deutsche Eishockey Liga in Germany until 2011.  In the NHL, he played for the St. Louis Blues and the New York Islanders between 2001 and 2004.

Career

Papineau was born in Ottawa, Ontario. As a youth, he played in the 1994 Quebec International Pee-Wee Hockey Tournament with a minor ice hockey team from South Ottawa. He was drafted in the second round, #46 overall by the Los Angeles Kings in the 1998 NHL Entry Draft.

He was then re-selected in the third round, #75 overall by the St. Louis Blues in the 2000 NHL Entry Draft when the Kings were unable to sign him to a contract within the two-year deadline and retain his rights. It was reported that negotiations between the team's front office and Papineau broke down at least partially due to the involvement an overbearing agent demanding a huge entry contract.

Papineau has played 81 career NHL games for the Blues and New York Islanders, scoring 11 goals and 8 assists for 19 points. Papineau was once compared to star Steve Yzerman, but those comparisons never came to fruition at the NHL level. He left then on 6 April 2009 EHC Wolfsburg Grizzly Adams to sign with Adler Mannheim.

Career statistics

References

External links
 

1980 births
Living people
Adler Mannheim players
Belleville Bulls players
Bridgeport Sound Tigers players
Canadian ice hockey centres
Ice hockey people from Ottawa
Los Angeles Kings draft picks
Lowell Devils players
New York Islanders players
St. Louis Blues draft picks
St. Louis Blues players
Worcester IceCats players
Canadian expatriate ice hockey players in Germany